You Must Remember This is a 1987 novel by Joyce Carol Oates. It tells the story of Enid Maria, a girl who falls in love with her uncle, a professional boxer. It also is about her family, the Stevicks, and their thriving life in Port Oriskany, a fictional industrial city in upstate New York.

Ties to other media
The book's title comes from the song "As Time Goes By" (1931), whose first lines are, "You must remember this / a kiss is just a kiss"; the tune was made famous when used as the theme song for Casablanca (1942).
Lyle Stevik was the alias used by a formerly unidentified man who committed suicide by hanging in 2001, in a motel in Amanda Park, Washington. The man was seen alive prior to his death, including at the hotel where he died. In May 2018, it was announced that "Lyle" was identified after nearly 17 years, and that the discovery was made with assistance from a non-profit organization called the DNA Doe Project. The man was 25 years old when he died and had previously resided in California. His relatives requested for his identity to be withheld.  He had checked in as Lyle Stevik, presumably using the name of a character from Oates' book.

References

1987 American novels
Dutton Penguin books
Novels by Joyce Carol Oates
Novels set in New York (state)
Novels about boxing